Horacio "Boy" Morales, Jr. (September 11, 1943 – February 29, 2012) was a Filipino economist and politician. A prominent figure in the underground left during the martial law rule of President Ferdinand Marcos, he later served as Secretary of Agrarian Reform during the presidency of Joseph Estrada. In 2018, Morales was recognized by the Human Rights Victims Claims Board as a Motu Proprio human rights violations victim of the Martial Law era.

Biography

Morales was born in Moncada, Tarlac. He obtained a Bachelor of Arts in Economics degree from the University of the Philippines in 1965, and a master's degree in economics from the University of Oklahoma in 1968.

Morales entered government service in 1965, joining the economic staff of President Ferdinand Marcos as a senior economist. He eventually became the executive vice-president of the Development Academy of the Philippines.

In 1977, Morales was named among the Ten Outstanding Young Men of the Philippines by the Philippine Jaycees. On the day he was supposed to have received the award, he announced his resignation from the Marcos government to join the underground armed resistance linked to the Communist Party of the Philippines. Morales was active in the underground movement until his arrest in 1982. He remained detained until 1986, when the newly installed presidency of Corazon Aquino ordered his release together with other political prisoners. In 1987, Morales unsuccessfully ran for a seat in the Philippine Senate under the banner of the Partido ng Bayan. Morales served as President of the Philippine Rural Reconstruction Movement from 1986 to 1998.

In 1998, Morales was appointed to the Cabinet of President Joseph Estrada as Secretary of Agrarian Reform. He served in that capacity until the removal of Estrada from office following the Second EDSA Revolution. Morales also headed Estrada's political party, the Partido ng Masang Pilipino, and served as chairman of the board of the Development Academy of the Philippines during Estrada's term.

Morales has remained active with non-governmental organizations since leaving government service. In December 2011, he was stricken by a heart attack in Baguio that left him in critical condition and in a coma. Morales remained in a coma until his death on February 29, 2012.

References

 

1943 births
2012 deaths
People from Tarlac
Secretaries of Agrarian Reform of the Philippines
Filipino communists
University of the Philippines alumni
Arroyo administration cabinet members
Estrada administration cabinet members